Cornelius "Con" O'Callaghan (23 March 1908 – 22 May 1976) was an Irish track and field athlete. In 1928, he became the first Irish Olympian to compete in decathlon.

O'Callaghan was the middle of three sons of Paddy O'Callaghan and Jane Healy. His eldest brother Seán played football and won a national title in the 440 yards hurdles, whereas his other brother Pat was the Olympic champion in hammer throw in 1928 and 1932.

References

External links
 

1908 births
1976 deaths
Athletes (track and field) at the 1928 Summer Olympics
Olympic athletes of Ireland
People from Kanturk
Sportspeople from County Cork
Irish decathletes
Irish male athletes